The 2016 King Cup, or The Custodian of The Two Holy Mosques Cup, was the 41st season of King Cup since its establishment in 1957, and the 9th under the current edition. It started on 19 January and ended on 29 May 2016. Al-Hilal were the defending champions, but they were eliminated in the semifinals.

Al-Ahli won their third title in the current edition and the thirteenth overall after beating Al-Nassr 2–1 after extra time in the final.

Participating teams
A total of 32 teams participated in this season., 14 teams of Professional league, 16 teams of First Division, and 2 teams qualifying from preliminary stage.

Bracket

Note:     H: Home team,   A: Away team

source: SAFF

Round of 32
Round of 32 were played between 19 and 25 January 2016. All times are local, AST (UTC+3).

Round of 16
Round of 16 were played between 31 January and 18 March 2016. All times are local, AST (UTC+3).

Quarter-finals
Quarter-finals were played on 12 and 13 April 2016. All times are local, AST (UTC+3).

Notes

Semi-finals
Semi-finals were played on 29 and 30 April 2016. All times are local, AST (UTC+3).

Final

References

2016
King Cup
Saudi Arabia